Darevskia aghasyani is a lizard species in the genus Darevskia. It is endemic to Armenia.

References

Darevskia
Reptiles of Armenia
Endemic fauna of Armenia
Reptiles described in 2019